is a Japanese film director, screenwriter, and occasional actor. He is primarily known for directing Japanese horror films, most notably Noroi: The Curse.

Background
Kōji Shiraishi was born and raised in Fukuoka, Japan. After graduating from Kyushu Sangyo University with a degree in film making, he went on to work as an assistant director on such films as Gakuryū Ishii's August in the Water and Shinobu Yaguchi's Waterboys.

He cites Gakuryū Ishii as his favorite Japanese director, and Ishii's 1980 Crazy Thunder Road as his favorite film.  Other directors he admires include John Carpenter, Brian De Palma, Abbas Kiarostami, and Sam Raimi, and films he enjoy include the original Dawn of the Dead (1978), The Evil Dead (1981), Evil Dead 2: Dead by Dawn (1987), The Thing (1982), and The Texas Chain Saw Massacre (1974).

Filmography
 Suiyō puremia: Sekai Saikyō J Horā SP Nihon no Kowai Yoru (2004, made-for-TV)
 Za Horā Kaiki Gekijō: Kaiki! Shinin Shōjo (2004, short film)
 Ju-Rei: The Uncanny (2004)
 Noroi: The Curse (2005)
 Bakkan! Gurabia teikoku (2007, TV series)
 Carved (2007)
 Ura horā (2008, direct-to-video)
 Takada Wataru Teki Zero (2008)
 Grotesque (2009)
 Occult (2009)
 Teketeke (2009)
 Teketeke 2 (2009)
 Shirome (2010)
 Bachiatari Bōryoku Ningen (2010)
 Chō Akunin (2011)
 The Showing - The Scariest Meeting Ever (2013, short film)
 Cult (2013)
 A Record Of Sweet Murder (2014)
 Sadako vs. Kayako (2016)
 Impossibility Defense (2018)
 Koi no Crazy Road (2018)
 Hell Girl (2019)
 Seoul 2020 DJM2000G Opening Ceremony (2020, "The Phantom Ballroom" segment)
 Safe Word (2022)
 Welcome to the Occult Forrest: The Movie (2022)

References

External links
 

1973 births
Japanese film directors
Japanese horror fiction
Horror film directors
Living people
People from Fukuoka